= Sound production =

Sound production may refer to:

- Audio engineering
- Creation of sound through speech, using a musical instrument, etc.
- Record production
- Sound design
